Karen Glaser  was an English actress, who was best known for playing Madame Chargon in A Patriotic Offering  of the first episode of the fourth series of the period drama Upstairs, Downstairs. It first aired on 14 September 1974 on ITV.

She was also known for playing Erica Vargas in the episodes The Last Journey  and Budapest of the series of The Wanderer (1959). She was also known for playing Shirley Coniston in the Playbox (1959).

She was also known for Very Like a Whale (1980) and The Two Ronnies (1971).

References

External links
 

English film actresses
English television actresses
Possibly living people